Héðinn Gilsson (born 22 September 1969) is an Icelandic former handball player who competed in the 1992 Summer Olympics.

References

1969 births
Living people
Hedinn Gilsson
Hedinn Gilsson
Handball players at the 1992 Summer Olympics